Laura Frances Mary Cullen (born 6 October 1989) is an Irish former cricketer who played as a right-arm medium-fast bowler. She appeared in 6 One Day Internationals and 5 Twenty20 Internationals for Ireland in 2011 and 2012.

References

External links
 
 

1989 births
Living people
Irish women cricketers
Ireland women One Day International cricketers
Ireland women Twenty20 International cricketers
Cricketers from Dublin (city)